Jabłonka  (Yablinka) is a village in the administrative district of Gmina Dydnia, within Brzozów County, Subcarpathian Voivodeship, in south-eastern Poland.

The village has a population of 1,100.

References

Villages in Brzozów County